Moody Blue is the twenty-fourth and final studio album by American singer and musician Elvis Presley, released on July 19, 1977 by RCA Records, four weeks before his death. The album was a mixture of live and studio work, and included the four tracks from Presley's final studio recording sessions in October 1976 and two tracks left over from the previous Graceland session in February 1976. "Moody Blue" was a previously published hit song recorded at the earlier Graceland session and held over for this album. Also recorded at the February session was "She Thinks I Still Care". "Way Down" became a hit after Presley's death less than one month after this album's release. The album was certified Gold and Platinum on September 12, 1977, and 2× Platinum on March 27, 1992, by the RIAA.

The first American pressings were pressed on translucent blue vinyl, for a limited run, the only time an Elvis record had been released in such a creative way. It soon reverted to black vinyl. However, after his death it returned to blue, making the US black vinyl the rarer of the two. Overseas all pressings were black vinyl.

Contents
As described in Elvis: The Illustrated Record, RCA was not able to obtain sufficient new studio material for a complete album, with all but two songs of Presley's studio recordings of 1976 having already been used in the previous album, From Elvis Presley Boulevard, Memphis, Tennessee or released as singles. The company chose to augment the remaining available works with three live songs recorded in Ann Arbor, Michigan, on April 24 and 26, 1977, which were heavily overdubbed for the album, and were also the final recordings Elvis would ever make. One of these was his version of "Unchained Melody", on which he accompanied himself on the piano. RCA producer Felton Jarvis had booked a recording studio in Nashville, Tennessee, for January 1977, to record some new tracks for this album. Presley had chosen a few songs to record with the help of Jarvis, most of them rather country and uptempo. Unfortunately, Presley never showed up at that session, claiming that he was sick and thus staying home (an excuse that Presley used rather frequently during the 1960s to avoid recording poor soundtracks for his motion pictures). Jarvis and RCA had nothing left to do but to fill the album with the live tracks mentioned above. However, since Elvis's death many unreleased recordings have been released showing that RCA had many usable masters but refused to use them, for reasons which remain unknown.  Also included is a live performance of "Let Me Be There" which had already been released three years earlier on his album Elvis: As Recorded Live on Stage in Memphis, even though, as noted, RCA had access to a previously unreleased live recording, "Softly, As I Leave You", which it would later utilize for a single release of "Unchained Melody".

The song "Moody Blue" was released as a single in November 1976 and it reached number one on the Billboard Country Singles Chart and #31 on the pop chart. "Way Down" was released as the album's next single during the early summer of 1977. It did not go very far up the chart, but it soared to #18 after Presley's death in August (jumping to number one in the U.K.) It was a bigger hit on the country charts, and it had risen to number one in the same week of the death of Presley. This album reached number three on the Billboard album charts after his death, although it had already entered the top 40 before he died. This was the last album by Presley to reach the top 40. Moody Blue was also a number one album on the Country Albums chart. Moody Blue was issued in July 1977, and it peaked on the album chart after Elvis' death on August 16, 1977.

RCA pressed the album on blue vinyl, to match the title track. Since colored vinyl pressings were relatively uncommon at the time, and they almost never occurred in a wide release, this has led to collectors mistakenly assuming that blue vinyl copies of Moody Blue are collectors' items, when in fact, the true collectables are pressings from immediately before Presley's death on standard black vinyl. (Immediately following his death, the production of Moody Blue was shifted back to blue vinyl. However, in later years the album was produced again using standard black vinyl).
Following Presley's death, "Unchained Melody" was also released as a single, and it peaked at #6 on the country music charts. This version was not the same as on the Moody Blue LP. The single version was an overdubbed version of the song, recorded in Rapid City, June 21, 1977.

Reissues
The original RCA CD issue contained the same tracks and cover art as the original vinyl LP. RCA reissued the album on CD again in 2000 with revised cover art including a different concert photo of Elvis and omitted the track "Let Me Be There", due to its presence on Elvis: As Recorded Live on Stage in Memphis, and it added the complete album From Elvis Presley Boulevard, Memphis, Tennessee as tracks 10–19 – in effect compiling the Graceland sessions rather than reissuing the original album. In 2013, Moody Blue was reissued on the Follow That Dream label in a special edition that contained the original album tracks along with a selection of alternate takes.

Track listing

Original release

Follow That Dream re-issue

Personnel 
 Elvis Presley – vocals, piano on "Unchained Melody", executive producer
 The Sweet Inspirations – backing vocals
 Sherrill Nielsen – backing vocals
 Kathy Westmoreland – backing vocals
 J.D. Sumner & The Stamps – backing vocals
 Myrna Smith – backing vocals
 James Burton – lead guitar
 John Wilkinson – rhythm guitar
 Jerry Scheff – bass except "Let Me Be There"
 Duke Bardwell – bass on "Let Me Be There"
 Tony Brown – piano except "Unchained Melody", "Let Me Be There", "Moody Blue" and "She Thinks I Still Care", overdubbed organ on "Unchained Melody"
 Glen D. Hardin – piano on "Moody Blue", "Let Me Be There" and "She Thinks I Still Care"
 David Briggs – Fender Rhodes electric piano, clavinet, overdubbed piano on "Unchained Melody", "If You Love Me (Let Me Know)" and "Little Darlin’"
 Ron Tutt – drums
 Bergen White – string and horn arrangements
Overdubbed
Bobby Ogdin — acoustic piano on "Unchained Melody" and "Little Darlin'"
 Norbert Putnam – bass on "Unchained Melody"
 Alan Rush – guitar on "Unchained Melody", "If You Love Me (Let Me Know)" and "Little Darlin’", backing vocals on "Little Darlin’" 
 Dennis Linde – bass on “Unchained Melody”, “If You Love Me (Let Me Know)” and “Little Darlin’”, backing vocals on “Little Darlin’” 
 Randy Cullers – drums on "Unchained Melody", "If You Love Me (Let Me Know)" and "Little Darlin’"
 Farrell Morris – percussion and bells on "Unchained Melody"

Technical
 Don Wardell – executive producer, producer
 Chick Crumpacker – producer
 Dick Baxter – engineer
 Glenn Meadows – original mastering
 Vic Anesini – digital remastering

Charts

Weekly charts

Year-end charts

Certifications

References

External links
 
 AFL1-2428 Moody Blue Guide part of The Elvis Presley Record Research Database
 AQL1-2428 Moody Blue Guide part of The Elvis Presley Record Research Database

Elvis Presley albums
Albums produced by Felton Jarvis
1977 albums
RCA Records albums
Albums recorded in a home studio